Saruni-ye Sofla (also Romanized as Sarūnī-ye Soflá; also known as Sarānī-ye Pā’īn) is a village in Eslamabad Rural District, in the Central District of Jiroft County, Kerman Province, Iran. At the 2006 census, its population was 345, in 71 families.

References 

Populated places in Jiroft County